Oswestry was a United Kingdom Parliamentary constituency. It was a constituency of the House of Commons of the Parliament of the United Kingdom from 1885 to 1983, when it was renamed North Shropshire. It elected one Member of Parliament (MP)  by the first past the post method of election.

Boundaries 
1885–1918: The Borough of Oswestry, the Sessional Divisions of Chirbury, Condover, Ford, Oswestry, and Pimhill (except Myddle), and the parish of Fitz.

1918–1949: The Borough of Oswestry, the Urban Districts of Ellesmere, Market Drayton, Wem, and Whitchurch, and the Rural Districts of Drayton, Ellesmere, Oswestry, Wem, and Whitchurch.

1950–1966: The Borough of Oswestry, the Urban Districts of Ellesmere, Market Drayton, Wem, and Whitchurch, and the Rural Districts of Drayton, Ellesmere, Oswestry, and Wem.

1966–1967: The Borough of Oswestry, the Urban Districts of Ellesmere, Wem, and Whitchurch, and the Rural Districts of Ellesmere, Market Drayton, Oswestry, and Wem.

1967–1974: The Rural Districts of Market Drayton, North Shropshire and Oswestry.

1974–1983: The District of North Shropshire and the Borough of Oswestry.

Members of Parliament

Election results

Elections in the 1880s

Elections in the 1890s

Elections in the 1900s

Elections in the 1910s 

General Election 1914–15:

Another General Election was required to take place before the end of 1915. The political parties had been making preparations for an election to take place and by July 1914, the following candidates had been selected; 
Unionist: William Bridgeman
Liberal:

Elections in the 1920s

Elections in the 1930s

Elections in the 1940s 
General Election 1939–40:
Another General Election was required to take place before the end of 1940. The political parties had been making preparations for an election to take place from 1939 and by the end of this year, the following candidates had been selected; 
Conservative: Bertie Leighton
Liberal:

Elections in the 1950s

Elections in the 1960s

Elections in the 1970s

References

See also
Parliamentary constituencies in Shropshire#Historical constituencies
List of former United Kingdom Parliament constituencies
Unreformed House of Commons

Parliamentary constituencies in Shropshire (historic)
Constituencies of the Parliament of the United Kingdom established in 1885
Constituencies of the Parliament of the United Kingdom disestablished in 1983